Robert Lawson Rose (October 12, 1804 – March 14, 1877) was a U.S. Representative from New York, son of Robert Selden Rose and son-in-law of Nathaniel Allen.

Born in Geneva, New York, Rose received limited schooling as a youth. He moved to Allens Hill, New York and engaged in agricultural pursuits. He held several local offices, and then was elected as a Whig to the Thirtieth and Thirty-first Congresses (March 4, 1847 – March 3, 1851). Afterwards he resumed agricultural pursuits and returned to Geneva, New York. He subsequently moved to Pleasant Grove, near Funkstown, Maryland, in 1868, and engaged in the manufacture of paper until his death there. He was interred in Rose Hill Cemetery (Maryland), Hagerstown, Maryland.

Sources

1804 births
1877 deaths
Burials at Rose Hill Cemetery (Hagerstown, Maryland)
Whig Party members of the United States House of Representatives from New York (state)
19th-century American politicians